Răzvan Lucian Greu (born 16 March 1995) is a Romanian professional footballer who plays as a midfielder for Liga II club Unirea Dej . In his career, Greu also played for Universitatea Cluj, Sepsi OSK Sfântu Gheorghe or Farul Constanța, among others.

Honours
Universitatea Cluj
 Liga III: 2017–18

References

External links
 
 

1995 births
Living people
Romanian footballers
Association football midfielders
Liga I players
Liga II players
FC Universitatea Cluj players
CS Mioveni players
FC Botoșani players
Sepsi OSK Sfântu Gheorghe players
FCV Farul Constanța players
AFC Unirea Slobozia players
FC Unirea Dej players
Sportspeople from Târgu Mureș